Sophia "Sonia" Baram (born November 24, 2008) is an American pair skater. With her skating partner, Daniel Tioumentsev, she is the 2023 World Junior champion, 2022–23 Junior Grand Prix Final silver medalist, the 2022 JGP Czech Republic champion, the 2022 JGP Poland II bronze medalist, and the 2022 U.S. junior national champion.

Personal life 
Baram was born on November 24, 2008, in Beverly Hills, California, to parents Pavel and Anna. She has a brother, Alex. Baram homeschools through Connections Academy, an online program.

Programs

With Tioumentsev

Competitive highlights 
JGP: Junior Grand Prix

Pairs with Tioumentsev

Women's singles

Pairs with Edwards

References

External links 
 

2008 births
Living people
American female figure skaters
American female pair skaters
People from Beverly Hills, California